The Assistant Secretary for Terrorist Financing is an office of the United States government within the United States Treasury Department.

Establishment and responsibilities
The office of Assistant Secretary for Terrorist Financing is statutorily responsible for "formulating and coordinating the counter terrorist financing and anti-money laundering efforts of the Department of the Treasury". It is subordinate to that of the Undersecretary for Terrorism and Financial Crimes and is appointed by the President of the United States, subject to the approval of the U.S. Senate. The office of Assistant Secretary for Terrorist Financing was established by the United States Congress in 2004.

Previous officeholders

See also
 Terrorism
 Assistant Secretary of the Treasury

References

Counterterrorism in the United States
United States Department of the Treasury